The 2019–20 Swedish Basketball League season, formerly known as Basketligan, was the 27th season of the Swedish Basketball League (SBL), the top tier basketball league on Sweden. The season started on 25 September 2019 and ended prematurely on 13 March 2020 due to the coronavirus pandemic. The Södertälje Kings are the defending champions.

Borås was named league champions.

Competition format
The participating teams first play a conventional round-robin schedule with every team playing each opponent four times for a total of 36 games. The top eight teams qualified for the championship playoffs.

Due to the coronavirus pandemic, the competition was suspended from 12 March until 30 April 2020 and playoffs were eliminated. Finally, one day later, the league was terminated and leader Borås was declared as league champion.

Teams

Djurgårdens promoted as champion of the Superettan and replaced Uppsala, last qualified in the previous season and relegated.

Regular season

League table

Results

Swedish clubs in European competitions

References

External links
Official Basketligan website

Basketligan seasons
Sweden
Basketligan